Abell 754 is a galaxy cluster in the constellation Hydra that was formed from the collision of two smaller clusters. This collision, which began about 300 million years ago, is ongoing, and the system is still disturbed.  Eventually, the cluster will reach a level of equilibrium in a few billion years.

See also
 Abell catalogue
 List of Abell clusters

References

External links
 MASSIVE MERGER OF GALAXIES IS THE MOST POWERFUL ON RECORD (NASA)
 Galaxies rent asunder in huge cosmic collision

Galaxy clusters
Hydra (constellation)
0754
Abell richness class 2